Yellow Creek is an unincorporated community in Kent Township, Stephenson County, Illinois, United States.

References

Unincorporated communities in Stephenson County, Illinois
Unincorporated communities in Illinois